Sanjiv Goenka born on 29 January 1961,  is a Bengali-Indian entrepreneur. He is the founder and chairman of RPSG Group and an early-stage investor. With a US$6 billion asset base and US$4.3 billion revenue, this multinational conglomerate is headquartered in Kolkata. He also owns the IPL cricket team Lucknow Super Giants and the ISL football team ATK Mohun Bagan FC. As per the Forbes 2022 report, he is the 83rd richest person in India and overall 1238th in the world.

Early life 
Goenka was born to Sushila Devi Goenka and Rama Prasad Goenka in a Marwari Family and raised in Kolkata.

Education 
An alumnus of St. Xavier's College, Kolkata, Goenka received his Bachelor of Commerce Degree in 1981.

Board memberships 
 IIT Kharagpur
 International Management Institute
 Firstsource

References

External links 

 Profile at CESC Limited
 Profile at Forbes

1961 births
Living people
Businesspeople from Kolkata
Goenka Family
St. Xavier's College, Kolkata alumni
People from Kolkata
Indian Premier League franchise owners
Indian football chairmen and investors
RPSG Group